Eagle Lake is an alpine lake in the Southern Sierra Nevada near Mineral King in Sequoia National Park.

See also
List of lakes in California

External links

Lakes of California
Sequoia National Park
Lakes of Tulare County, California
Lakes of Northern California